Maureen Connolly was the two-time defending champion and successfully defended her title, defeating Doris Hart 6–2, 6–4 in the final to win the women's singles tennis title at the 1953 U.S. National Championships. With this win, she became the first woman in history to win a Grand Slam.

Seeds
The seeded players are listed below. Maureen Connolly is the champion; others show in brackets the round in which they were eliminated.

  Maureen Connolly (champion)
  Doris Hart (finalist)
  Shirley Fry (semifinals)
  Louise Brough (semifinals)
  Margaret Osborne duPont (quarterfinals)
  Althea Gibson (quarterfinals)
  Helen Perez (quarterfinals)
  Babara Lewis (third round)

Draw

Key
 Q = Qualifier
 WC = Wild card
 LL = Lucky loser
 r = Retired

Final eight

References

1953
1953 in women's tennis
1953 in American women's sports
Women's Singles